The University Athletic Association of the Philippines (UAAP) Judo Tournament was previously held during the second semester of the school year. Due to a conflict with volleyball television coverage, though, it was moved to the first semester. Judo was a demonstration sport in the Juniors Division in UAAP Season 69, 70, and 71, and is not included in the official count of total titles.

For this event, both the Men's and Women's teams have seven weight divisions each, and two representatives per weight division. Gold, silver, and bronze medals are awarded to the winners of each division, with each medal being assigned a corresponding number of points. A gold medal is worth 10 points; silver, 5; and bronze, 2. The medal tally and accumulated points per team determines the overall standing of each team, with the highest-scoring team receiving the championship trophy. Men's and Women's medal tallies are independent of each other, yielding one champion for the Men's division, and one champion for the Women's division.

One judoka from the Men's division and one from the Women's receives a Most Valuable Player (MVP) Award. The same goes for the Rookie of the Year Award. These awardees are chosen after the competition has concluded and the complete medal tallies are in. Judokas from the Champion team are the only ones who can vie for the MVP Award.

UAAP judo champions
Triple Championships:

Double Championships:

Demonstration sport:
 Fewer than four teams participating

Number of Championships by School

References

Judo
Judo competitions
Judo in the Philippines